Bēne Parish is an administrative territorial entity of Dobele Municipality, Latvia.

References

Parishes of Latvia
Dobele Municipality
Semigallia